A rating is an evaluation or assessment of something, in terms of quality, quantity, or some combination of both.

Rating or ratings may also refer to:

Business and economics
 Credit rating, estimating the credit worthiness of an individual, corporation or country
 Ranally city rating system, a tool used to classify U.S. cities based on economic function
 Telecommunications rating, the calculated cost of a phone call

Entertainment
 Arbitron ratings or Nielsen Audio, consumer research  on radio broadcasting audiences in the United States
 Content rating, the suitability of a TV broadcast, movie, comic book, or video game to its audience
 Motion picture rating system, categorizes films according to their suitability for adults and children
 Television content rating systems, categorizes TV shows based on suitability for audiences
 Video game content rating system, categorizes video games based on suitability for players
 Audience measurement
 Nielsen ratings, measuring viewership of United States television programs
 Sports rating system, analyzes the results of sports competitions

Polling and opinion
 Rating (sociological group), a Ukrainian non-governmental polling organization
 United States presidential approval rating, the percentage of respondents to an opinion poll who approve of a president
 Reputation system, programs that allow users to rate each other in online communities

Technology and engineering
 Rating (electrical), the voltage at which the appliance is designed to work
 Fire-resistance rating, the duration for a passive fire protection to withstand a standard fire resistance test
 Cetane rating, an indicator of the combustion speed of diesel fuel and compression needed for ignition
 Octane rating, a standard measure of the performance of an engine or aviation fuel
 Performance Rating, formerly  a method of comparing x86 computer processors
 Power rating, in electrical or mechanical engineering, the highest power input allowed to flow through particular equipment

Other uses
 Rating (chess), estimate of the strength of a player, based on performance versus other players
 Elo rating system, a rating system used in chess and in other sports and games
 Rating (clinical trials), the process by which a human evaluator subjectively judges the response of a patient to a medical treatment
 Rating (wine), score assigned by one or more wine critics to a wine
 Rating site, a website designed for users to vote on or rate people or content
Naval rating, an enlisted member of a navy or coast guard defined by rank and job description.
 Health care ratings, evaluations of health care
 Rating system of the Royal Navy - an historic method to classify ship by how heavily armed they are. Applied to other navies vessels as a comparisor.

See also
 
 
 Rate (disambiguation)
 Television ratings (disambiguation)
 Grade (education), standardized measurements of varying levels of achievement
 Star (classification), symbols often used for ratings
 Likert scale, a psychometric scale commonly involved in research
 Parental Advisory, a warning label placed on audio recordings in recognition of excessive profanities or inappropriate references